Peter Feil (25 March 1947 – 28 February 2017) was a Swedish butterfly swimmer. He competed in two events at the 1968 Summer Olympics.

References

External links
 

1947 births
2017 deaths
Swedish male butterfly swimmers
Olympic swimmers of Sweden
Swimmers at the 1968 Summer Olympics
People from Eskilstuna
Sportspeople from Södermanland County